Daba is a town under the administration of Minqin County, Gansu, China. , it has one residential neighborhood, 12 villages, and one state-owned farm community under its administration:
Neighborhood
Wenhua Community

Villages
Qirun Village
Zhangwu Village
Caocheng Village
Chengjin Village
Liugou Village
Chengxi Village
Tianbin Village
Zhangmao Village
Wenyi Village
Wen'er Village
Bayi Village
Wangmou Village

Farm
Gansu Province State-Owned Qinfeng Farm Community

References 

Township-level divisions of Gansu
Minqin County